Qatar National Research and Education Network (QNREN)  was initiated in 2013 in Qatar under the auspices of the Supreme Council of Information and Communication Technology (now part of the Ministry of Transport and Communications).  QNREN is currently operated and managed by Qatar University.

References

External links

National research and education networks
Universities in Qatar